Jayaraman Gokulakrishnan (born 4 January 1973), better known as D. J. Gokulakrishnan, is an Indian former first-class cricketer who represented Tamil Nadu, Goa and Assam. He became a cricket coach after his playing career.

Career
As a right-arm medium pace bowler who batted right-handed in the lower-middle order, Gokulakrishnan made 39 first-class and 45 List A appearances between the 1993/94 and 2003/04 seasons. He mainly played for his home state Tamil Nadu and South Zone, while playing for Goa for two seasons and Assam for one season. He made over 1000 runs at an average of over 24 and took more than 100 wickets in his first-class career. He had a successful List A career as well, taking 71 wickets averaging below 21 per wicket and scoring 500-plus runs at a 25-plus average.

Gokulakrishnan became a cricket coach after retirement. In 2008, he was made the assistant coach of the Tamil Nadu Ranji team. He was appointed as the team's bowling coach in 2010 after Tamil Nadu Cricket Association (TNCA) decided to do away with head and assistant coaches for the senior team. He returned as the team's assistant coach in 2013 before the TNCA made him head coach of the Tamil Nadu under-19 team in 2015. He had also worked as the business development manager of IC Infotech (India Cements Group).

References

External links 
 
 

1973 births
Living people
Indian cricketers
Tamil Nadu cricketers
Goa cricketers
Assam cricketers
South Zone cricketers
Indian cricket coaches